Expo Park may refer to:

 Expo Commemoration Park in Suita, Osaka, Japan
 Expo Science Park in  Daejeon, South Korea
 Exposition Park in University Park, Los Angeles, California
 Exposition Park in South Dallas, Texas
 Shanghai Expo Park in Pudong Shanghai, China
 World Expo Park in Brisbane, Queensland, Australia